

Media

United States 
 La Voz Hispana de Virginia, a magazine
 La Voz de Houston, a newspaper
 La Voz (Phoenix), a newspaper
 La Voz, a publication in New York's Hudson Valley owned by Bard College

Other media 
 La Voz del Interior, a newspaper in Córdoba, Argentina
 La Voz Dominicana, a radio station in Dominican Republic
 La Voz de Michoacán, a newspaper in Mexico
 La Voz de Galicia, a newspaper in Spain

Music 
 A nickname for singer Felipe Rodríguez (1926–1999)
 La Voz (album), a 1975 album by Héctor Lavoe

Television shows based on The Voice 
 La Voz... Argentina
 La Voz Colombia
 La Voz (Mexican TV series)
 La Voz (Spanish TV series)
 La Voz (U.S. TV series)

See also 
 The Voice (disambiguation)
 La Voix (disambiguation)
 VOZ (disambiguation)